The Simonini Victor 2 Plus is an Italian aircraft engine, designed and produced by Simonini Racing of San Dalmazio di Serramazzoni for use in ultralight aircraft.

Design and development
The Victor 2 Plus is a twin in-line cylinder two-stroke, liquid-cooled, gasoline engine design, with a mechanical gearbox reduction drive with reduction ratios of 2.76:1 to 4.00:1. It employs  dual capacitor discharge ignition and produces  at 6200 rpm.

Very similar to the Simonini Victor 2 Super, the Victor 2 Plus uses a bore that is  smaller and this results in a displacement that is  smaller.

Specifications (Victor 2 Plus)

See also

References

External links
Official website

Simonini aircraft engines
Two-stroke aircraft piston engines